Sarsi may refer to:

 Sarsaparilla, a soft drink originally made from Smilax ornata plants
Sarsi, the trademarked name of a sarsaparilla-based soft drink brand
 Sarsi First Nation, a First Nation in Canada
 Orazio Grassi, who used "Sarsi" as his pseudonym